Koh Eng Kian (born 1 November 1956) is a Singaporean judoka. He competed in the men's half-heavyweight event at the 1976 Summer Olympics.

References

External links
 

1956 births
Living people
Singaporean male judoka
Olympic judoka of Singapore
Judoka at the 1976 Summer Olympics
Singaporean sportspeople of Chinese descent
Place of birth missing (living people)